RDBM may refer to:

 Relational database management system (RDBMS)
 Reliable database manager, a journaled layer on top of cdb
 Reyes del Bajo Mundo, a Salvadoran hip hop group